Grzegorz Podstawek (born 25 June 1979 in Wrocław) is a Polish former footballer who last played for KS Polkowice.

Career
In July 2011, he joined KS Polkowice.

References

External links
 

1979 births
Living people
KSZO Ostrowiec Świętokrzyski players
Polonia Bytom players
Polish footballers
Association football forwards
Arka Gdynia players
Górnik Polkowice players
Sportspeople from Wrocław
Bischofswerdaer FV 08 players
Polish expatriate footballers
Polish expatriate sportspeople in Germany
Expatriate footballers in Germany